Prosoplus costatus is a species of beetle in the family Cerambycidae. It was described by Karl-Ernst Hüdepohl in 1996. It is known from Borneo and Malaysia.

References

Prosoplus
Beetles described in 1996